The 4th constituency of Győr-Moson-Sopron County is one of the single member constituencies of the National Assembly, the national legislature of Hungary. The constituency standard abbreviation: Győr-Moson-Sopron 04. OEVK.

Since 2018, it has been represented by Attila Barcza of the Fidesz–KDNP party alliance.

Geography
The 4th constituency is located in western part of Győr-Moson-Sopron County.

List of municipalities
The constituency includes the following municipalities:

Members
The constituency was first represented by Mátyás Firtl of the Fidesz from 2014 to 2018. Attila Barcza of the Fidesz was elected in 2018
and he was re-elected in 2018and he was re-elected in 2022.

References

Győr-Moson-Sopron 4th